Laothoe is a genus of moths in the family Sphingidae first distinguished by Johan Christian Fabricius in 1807.

Species
Laothoe amurensis (Staudinger, 1892)
Laothoe austanti (Staudinger, 1877)
Laothoe habeli Saldaitis, Ivinskis & Borth, 2010
Laothoe philerema (Djakonov, 1923)
Laothoe populeti (Bienert, 1870)
Laothoe populetorum (Staudinger, 1887)
Laothoe populi (Linnaeus, 1758)

References

 
Smerinthini
Moth genera
Taxa named by Johan Christian Fabricius